At the 1908 Summer Olympics, seven track cycling events were contested, all for men only. The weather was poor, with rainfall causing the track to flood on occasion.

Medal summary

Participating nations
A total of 97 cyclists from 11 nations competed at the London Games:

Medal table

Cycle polo
Cycle polo was a demonstration sport at these Olympics with Ireland winning, beating Germany.

Notes

References
 International Olympic Committee medal winners database

 
1908 Summer Olympics events
1908
Cycle racing in London
1908 in track cycling
1908 in cycle racing
Cycling competitions in the United Kingdom